Bish Bosch is the fourteenth and final solo studio album by American singer Scott Walker.  It was released on 3 December 2012 on 4AD. Walker described it as the final installment in a trilogy that also includes Tilt (1995) and The Drift (2006). At seventy-three minutes, Bish Bosch is Walker's longest studio album, and contains his longest song, the twenty-one minute, forty-one second "SDSS1416+13B (Zercon, A Flagpole Sitter)".

Background and recording
Unlike his previous experimental albums, which were written over several years, Bish Bosch was written in just over a year. Walker had set aside a year to focus exclusively on writing, to speed up his process, and described it as "lightning speed". Even so, he still "had to wait and wait and wait almost every single day for the words to come". The music was recorded over a period of two years, with lengthy gaps between sessions due to various problems: trouble booking studios, the death of producer Walsh's father, and availability of musicians (including Walker himself, who scored a dance for the Royal Opera House).

Walker got the idea for "SDSS14+13B (Zercon, A Flagpole Sitter)" while browsing a friend's library and learning of Zercon, the court jester of Attila; he considered Zercon a "fantastic character" and was surprised no one had used him. The song begins with Zercon performing for Attilla, then trying to escape and reach a "spiritual sovereignty", ultimately failing, and becoming a dwarf star and burning out.

Walker explained the title: (bracketed content quoted; linking added)
I knew I'd be playing with language more than I had on any of the previous albums. I wanted the title to introduce you to this kind of idea and reflect the feeling of the album, which was [claps hands briskly] bish bosh. And we know what bish bosh means here in this country – it means job done or sorted. In urban slang bish also [phonetically] means bitch, like "Dis is ma bitch". And then I wrote Bosch like the artist [Hieronymus]. I was then thinking in the terms of this giant universal female artist. And this idea continued to play through the record in certain spots.

Reception
At Metacritic, which assigns a normalized rating out of 100 to reviews from mainstream critics, the album received an average score of 78, based on 33 professional reviews. The recording was selected as 'Album of the Week' in The Independent, The Guardian and The Sunday Times, 'Album of the Month' in Mojo magazine, and 'Album of the Year' by Tiny Mix Tapes. The album placed 11th in The Wires annual critics' poll.

Track listing
All tracks composed by Scott Walker.

Personnel

Musicians
Scott Walker – Vocals,  Electric Guitar (9),  Keyboards (8, 9),  Percussion (9)
Hugh Burns – Acoustic Guitar (2, 4, 6),  Electric Guitar (1, 2, 3, 4, 5, 7),  Electric Baritone Guitar (1, 2, 3, 4, 5, 7),  E-Bow Guitar (1, 4, 7),  Dobro (4),  Ukulele (5),  Hawaiian Pedal Steel (5)
James Stevenson – Electric Guitar (2, 4),  Electric Baritone Guitar (1, 2, 4),  Mando Guitar (4)
Alasdair Malloy – Percussion (1, 2, 3, 4, 5, 6, 7),  Tuned Gongs (6),  Machetes (7)
Mark Warman – Keyboards (1, 2, 3, 4, 5, 6, 7),  Drum Programming (1),  Tuned Gongs (6),  Handclaps (5),  Machetes (7)
Peter Walsh – Keyboards FX (1, 2, 3, 4, 5, 6, 7),  Drum Programming (1),  Finger Snaps (5)
Ian Thomas – Drums (2, 3, 4, 5, 6, 7, 8)
John Giblin – Bass (2, 3, 4, 5, 6, 7),  Double Bass (8)
Paul Willey – Violin Harmonics (2)
Michael Laird – Rams Horns (Kudu,  Shofar) (4)
Pete Long – Baritone Saxophone (4, 5),  Tubax (4, 5, 7)
BJ Cole – Hawaiian Pedal Steel (5)
Guy Barker – Trumpet (5)
Tom Rees – Trumpet (5)
Andrew McDonnell – Lo Rumbles & White Noise (5)

Orchestra
Conductor & Orchestrator – Mark Warman (2, 4, 6)
1st Violins – Paul Willey (2, 4, 6),  Boguslaw Kostecki (2, 4, 6),  Jonathan Rees (2, 4, 6),  Laura Melhuish (2, 4, 6),  Dave Ogden (2, 4, 6),  Julian Trafford (2, 4, 6),  Abigail Young (2, 4, 6),  Ruth Ehrlich (2, 4, 6),  Ann Morfee (2, 4, 6),  Dave Smith (2, 4, 6)
2nd Violins – Steve Morris (2, 4, 6),  Tom Piggott-Smith (2, 4, 6),  Charlie Brown (2, 4, 6),  Elizabet Wexler (2, 4, 6),  Sebastian Rudnicki (2, 4, 6),  Nikki Gleed (2, 4, 6),  Steve Bentley-Klein (2, 4, 6),  Brian Wright (2, 4, 6),  Clive Dobbins (2, 4, 6),  Paddy Roberts (2, 4, 6)
Celli – Frank Schaefer (2, 4, 6),  Justin Pearson (2, 4, 6),  Chris Fish (2, 4, 6),  Joely Koos (2, 4, 6),  Nerys Richards (2, 4, 6),  Dom Pecheur (2, 4, 6),  Tamsy Kayner (2, 4, 6),  Vicky Metthews (2, 4, 6)
Double Basses – Enno Senft (2, 4, 6),  Chris West (2, 4, 6),  Clare Tyack (2, 4, 6),  Steve Rossell (2, 4, 6),  Stacey Watton (2, 4, 6),  Alice Kent (2, 4, 6),  Stephen Warner (4),  Lucy Hare (4)

References

External links
Official minisite

Scott Walker (singer) albums
2012 albums
4AD albums